Citrus platymamma, called byeonggyul in Korean and benjul in Jeju, is a Korean citrus fruit native to Jeju Island.

History 
Two old byeonggyul trees in Doryeon-dong were designated as treasures of Jeju on 7 January 1998; However, one died on 5 October 2005. The remaining tree was designated as a Natural Monument of South Korea on 13 January 2011. It is presumed to be around 250 years old, and can be found at 21, Doryeon 6-gil, Jeju, Jeju Province.

In 2010, several 80-year-old byeonngyul trees were transplanted to Geummul orchard, an orchard once set out for growing citruses consumed at the court of the Joseon Dynasty. It disappeared with the end of the dynasty and was restored in 2010 by Seogwipo Agricultural Technology Center.

Etymology 

Jeju benjul and Korean byeonggyul are cognates. They share the same hanja characters: byeong ("bottle") and gyul ("citrus fruit").

Tamnaji, a chronicle of Jeju Island published in 1653 by a Joseon dynasty governor, Yi Wonjin, mentions byeonggyul using the name byeolgyul ("peculiar citrus"). According to the author, the fruit is usually called byeonggyul, a compound of byeong ("bottle") and gyul ("citrus"), because its shape tapers towards the top and resembles an upside down jongji ("tiny bowl").

Description 
Genomic evidence has suggested that byeonggyul, sweet oranges, and key limes shared a common ancestor. Byeonggyul is known to be more resistant to cold, blight and insect attack than other related citrus fruits.

The dense, thin and low branches give the tree a shrubby appearance. The flowers are formed of five white ovate petals.

Like that of the related citruses, the byeonggyul fruit has a fragrant dimpled rind.

Uses 
The flesh can be eaten raw, and the peel can be used fresh or dried, whole or zested. Fresh zest of a byeonggyul is used for tteok (rice cakes) and other Korean food as a spice or garnish, while dried peel is usually used for making tea. Byeonggyul tea was used as a home remedy to treat respiratory ailments, loss of appetite or minor digestive problems.

See also 
 Dangyuja

References 

Citrus
Endemic flora of South Korea
Jeju Province
Korean fruit